SMK Bahang is a secondary school in Sabah which is located at Penampang, Kota Kinabalu. SMK Bahang is located close to the capital city, Kota Kinabalu. The students of SMK Bahang are known as Budak Bahang, but some of them prefer the name Bahangite, a demonym for student of SMK Bahang.

The school is named after the village of Kampung Bahang, which is located near to Kampung Koidupan and KDCA (Kadazan Dusun Cultural Association). The majority of the students, including staff, come from Penampang and some of them are from Putatan, Luyang and near to the city of Kota Kinabalu. SMK Bahang is located between Donggongon Town and the capital city of Kota Kinabalu.

History 
SMK Bahang was established in December 1994 and was officially opened by the Prime Minister, Datuk Seri Mohd. Najib bin Tun Abdul Razak, who was then the Minister of Education Malaysia, with the motto "Together Realizing the Educational Excellence" (Bersama Merealisasikan Kecermelangan Pendidikan). At the end of its of construction, the school had 24 classrooms.

On the opening day, six classrooms opened to accommodate 272 students from graduate students while a number of passed PMR students from other schools were placed here to further their studies in Form 4. A special education class was established in January 1995.

Classrooms and infrastructures 
SMK Bahang have 36 classrooms for the lower and upper secondary students and four classrooms for special education. Lower secondary students (Form 1 to Form 3) have 24 classrooms, divided into eight classes for each grade; starting from Wawasan, Perdana, Bestari, Cemerlang, Dinamik, Dedikasi, Prihatin, and Lestari. Upper secondary students (Form 4 and Form 5) have 12 classrooms, arranged based on field of studies, including pure science, sports science, humanitarian, and arts. The classrooms are divided into six classes for Form 4 and Form 5 students; Science, Computer Science, Account, Sports Science, Perdana, Bestari, and Cemerlang.

SMK Bahang has eight science labs from Chemistry, Biology to Physics.

Fire of 31 December 2004 
On 31 December 2004, SMK Bahang had a tragedy when the highest floor of block A building was on fire. The school had another fire in 2002.  However, it did not prevent the school session of 2005. Computer labs, science labs and school canteens were used for teaching and learning process. The Form three students started their sessions 200 meters away in SK Bahang Penampang.

Sport houses 
The sport houses were named after the colour of gemstones. Previously, SMK Bahang had four sport houses, known as rumah sukan in the Malay language, but now the school has added two sport houses. The six houses compete against each other on sports day in Kompleks Sukan Penampang, Donggongon. The school sport houses are:

 Delima (red)
 Zamrud (green)
 Intan (yellow)
 Nilam (blue)

School song 
Kami Anak Warisan

Kami anak warisan,
Harapan bangsa dan negara,
Berusaha dan berjaya,
Menuju cita-cita.

SMK Bahang Penampang,
Sekolah kami yang tercinta,
Bersama para pendidik,
Menuju kejayaan.

Kami usaha, kami berjaya,
Berpandukan Rukun Negara,
Cogan kata kami yang indah,
Memberikan semangat waja.

Bersama berpimpin tangan,
Menentang segala rintangan,
Disiplin pegangan kami,
Berjaya selamanya.

Disiplin pegangan kami,
Berjaya selamanya.

Principals 
List of principals:

References

Schools in Sabah
Secondary schools in Malaysia
Educational institutions established in 1994
1994 establishments in Malaysia